Megan Duffy (born July 13, 1984) is an American women's basketball coach, currently the head coach at Marquette University. Previously, she had been the head coach with the Miami RedHawks women's basketball team, an associate head coach with the Michigan Wolverines women's basketball team, George Washington Colonials women's basketball team, an assistant coach with St. John's Red Storm women's basketball team, and a professional basketball player in the WNBA, most recently playing for the New York Liberty.

College playing career
Duffy was born in Kettering, Ohio. After graduating from Chaminade-Julienne High School, a Catholic high school in Dayton, she attended college at University of Notre Dame and graduated in 2006 with a double major in Psychology and Computer Applications. As an Irish athlete, Duffy was named to the CoSIDA Academic All American first team and was honorable mention Kodak All American. She received the Frances Pomeroy Naismith Award from the Women's Basketball Coaches Association as the best senior player under 5 ft 8 in (1.7 m). She is one of two players from Notre Dame, along with Niele Ivey, to win the award.

Notre Dame statistics
Source

USA Basketball
Duffy was a member of the team representing the US at the 2005 World University Games Team in İzmir, Turkey. In the opening game against the Czech Republic, she led her team in scoring with 14 points. Duffy averaged 6.1 points per game. She helped the team to a 7–0 record and a gold medal at the event.

Professional playing career
Following her collegiate career, she was selected 31st overall in the 2006 WNBA draft.  Duffy spent her rookie season with the Lynx backing up Amber Jacobs; she averaged 3.4 points, 1.2 assists and 12.5 minutes per game in 2006.

Duffy went to training camp with the Lynx in 2007 but was released on April 26. She signed with the Los Angeles Sparks on April 30, but she was waived on May 18 in the final preseason roster cutdown.

A free agent most of the 2007 season, Duffy was re-signed by the Lynx on August 7, due to Kathrin Ress' departure to train with the Italian National Team. Duffy appeared in four games with Minnesota, averaging 1.4 points per game.

On March 11, 2008, the New York Liberty signed Duffy to a training camp contract.

During the 2006–07 WNBA off-season she played for the Rhondda Rebels in Wales, UK. In the 2007–08 WNBA off-season she played for Ribera in Italy. She played for MBK Ružomberok in Slovakia from September through December 2008 during the WNBA off-season. In January 2009, Duffy signed with CSS LMK Sfântu Gheorghe in Romania.

WNBA career statistics

Regular season

|-
| align="left" | 2006
| align="left" | Minnesota
| 31 || 0 || 12.5 || .359 || .324 || .692 || 0.9 || 1.2 || 0.3 || 0.0 || 0.8 || 3.4
|-
| align="left" | 2007
| align="left" | Minnesota
| 5 || 0 || 9.6 || .111 || .125 || 1.000 || 1.0 || 1.4 || 0.2 || 0.0 || 0.8 || 1.4
|-
| align="left" | 2008
| align="left" | New York
| 6 || 0 || 7.5 || .333 || .250 || 1.000 || 0.3 || 0.5 || 0.0 || 0.0 || 0.8 || 1.8
|-
| align="left" | Career
| align="left" | 3 years, 2 teams
| 42 || 0 || 11.5 || .336 || .286 || .755 || 0.9 || 1.1 || 0.2 || 0.0 || 0.8 || 2.9

Coaching career
In 2009, Duffy retired from play and entered the coaching ranks as an assistant under Kim Barnes Arico at St. John's. Her initial responsibilities included guard skills, scouting, and game planning. In 2011–12, Duffy also became St. John's recruiting coordinator. In 2012, Duffy accepted the position as associate head coach with George Washington. In 2014, Duffy left George Washington to accept the position of assistant coach with the University of Michigan, where she spent three seasons before being named the head coach at Miami (OH) in 2017.

In two seasons with the Redhawks, Duffy accumulated a 44-20 overall record, including a 25–11 mark in league play. The team earned bids to the WNIT each season that she was there. In her first season at Miami in 2017–18, Duffy coached Miami to 21 wins, up from just 12 the previous season. This marked the largest improvement in the nation from the previous season in terms of total victories.

Duffy was named the head coach at Marquette on April 10, 2019, the sixth head coach in the program's history. Through three seasons, she boasts the best winning percentage of any coach in the program's history, going 66-26 (.717) overall and 40-16 (.713) in BIG EAST play. In her first year at MU, she was named the BIG EAST Coach of the Year after guiding the Golden Eagles to a runner-up finish in the league and a 22-7 overall record despite being picked ninth in the league's preseason coaches' poll. In November 2021, Duffy was named as one of the 40 Under 40 rising stars in women's basketball by The Athletic.

Stats
Sources:

 2017-2018 Schedule
 MAC 2017-18 Women's Basketball Standings

Head Coaching Record

References

External links
Marquette bio
St. John's coaching bio
WNBA stats
Notre Dame Player Bio
WNBA 2006 Draft prospect profile
Liberty signed Duffy to training camp contract
Eurobasket Player Profile

1984 births
Living people
American expatriate basketball people in Italy
American expatriate basketball people in Slovakia
American expatriate basketball people in the United Kingdom
American expatriate sportspeople in Wales
American women's basketball coaches
American women's basketball players
Basketball coaches from Ohio
Basketball players from Dayton, Ohio
George Washington Colonials women's basketball coaches
Marquette Golden Eagles women's basketball coaches
Miami RedHawks women's basketball coaches
Michigan Wolverines women's basketball coaches
Minnesota Lynx draft picks
Minnesota Lynx players
New York Liberty players
Notre Dame Fighting Irish women's basketball players
People from Kettering, Ohio
Point guards
St. John's Red Storm women's basketball coaches
Universiade gold medalists for the United States
Universiade medalists in basketball
United States women's national basketball team players